William Anthony Callegari Sr. (born September 23, 1941), is a businessman and  civil engineer from Katy, a suburb of Houston, Texas, who was a Republican member of the Texas House of Representatives. From 2001 to 2003, he represented District 130; in 2003, he was switched to neighboring District 132 in northwestern Harris County.

References

1941 births
Living people
People from Avoyelles Parish, Louisiana
School board members in Texas
Republican Party members of the Texas House of Representatives
American civil engineers
Businesspeople from Texas
Louisiana State University alumni
University of Houston alumni
People from Katy, Texas
21st-century American politicians